The Bak languages are a group of typologically Atlantic languages of Senegal and Guinea-Bissau linked in 2010 to the erstwhile Atlantic isolate Bijago. Bak languages are non-tonal.

Name
David Dalby coined the term Bak from the bVk- prefix found in the personal plural forms of demonstratives in the Bak languages. The -k- is not found in other Atlantic languages.

Languages

Classification of Bijago
Bijago is highly divergent. Sapir (1971) classified it as an isolate within West Atlantic. However, Segerer (2010) showed that this is primarily due to unrecognized sound changes, and that Bijago is in fact close to the Bak languages. For example, the following cognates in Bijago and Joola Kasa (one of the Jola languages) are completely regular, but had not previously been identified:

Segerer reconstructs the ancestral forms as *bu-gof and *di-gɛs, respectively, with the following developments:

 *bu-gof
 > *bu-kof > *bu-kow > fu-kow
 > *bu-ŋof > *bu-ŋo > (u-)bu
 *di-gɛs
 > *di-kis > *di-kil > ji-cil
 > *ne-ŋɛs > *ne-ŋɛ > nɛ

Comparative vocabulary
Comparison of basic vocabulary words of the Bak languages:

References

 
Atlantic languages